Maisons-du-Bois-Lièvremont is a commune in the Doubs department in the Bourgogne-Franche-Comté region in eastern France.

Geography
The village stretches along the main street and spreads over the plateau 50 m above the Doubs valley.

Population

See also
 Communes of the Doubs department

References

External links

 Maison-du-Bois-Lièvremont on the intercommunal Web site of the department 

Communes of Doubs